This is a discography of The Bouncing Souls, a New Jersey-based punk rock band. The band was formed in 1989.

Studio albums

Live albums

Compilation albums

EPs

Splits

Video albums

Music videos

Other appearances
The following Bouncing Souls songs were released on compilation albums, soundtracks, and other releases. This is not an exhaustive list; songs that were first released on the band's albums, EPs, or singles or later released on The Bad, the Worse, and the Out of Print are not included.

References

Punk rock group discographies
Discographies of American artists